The following retailers have all either closed or announced plans to close large numbers of retail locations, since 2010, during a time period labelled a "retail apocalypse" by media, accelerated by both the increase in online shopping and then by the economic impact of the COVID-19 pandemic.

Retailers A–D
 A.C. Moore announced on November 25, 2019, that all 145 of its stores would close. The Michaels Companies acquired its trademarks and websites, one distribution center, and the intellectual property rights of A.C. Moore for $58 million; Michaels also took over 40 store leases.
 Abercrombie & Fitch has closed 300 stores under its own brands, including Hollister Co. and abercrombie kids, since 2015.
 Aerosoles (AGI HoldCo) filed for Chapter 11 bankruptcy in September 2017 and closed 74 retail stores, leaving only four flagship stores in New York and New Jersey.
 Aéropostale filed for Chapter 11 bankruptcy in May 2016 and closed 113 stores in the United States, along with all of its 41 stores in Canada. It emerged from bankruptcy in September.
 A'gaci filed for Chapter 11 bankruptcy in February 2018 and announced plans to close 49 of its 76 stores. The chain filed for its second bankruptcy and liquidation on August 7, 2019, closing the remaining 54 stores with plans to auction its intellectual property.
 ALDO filed for bankruptcy on May 7, 2020, citing repercussions related to the COVID-19 pandemic as to why. The shoe chain emerged from bankruptcy two years later.
 Alfred Angelo bridal stores shuttered all locations on July 13, 2017, with little advance notice. Frustrated customers were handed bankruptcy forms after walking away empty-handed. The company's corporate offices were abandoned and stores across the United States emptied and shuttered, but the store's official website remained active with no reference to the closure.
 American Apparel closed all of its stores, a total of 110, in April 2017 after being acquired by Gildan Activewear. 2,400 workers were laid off.
 American Eagle Outfitters announced that it would close up to 200 to 250 mall-based locations in January 2021 while expanding its subsidiary Aerie significantly. Shares rose for the company afterward, ending up making Aerie a brand of over two billion dollars.
 The Andersons, a conglomerate based out of Toledo, Ohio, announced in January 2017 that it would close its remaining stores in Ohio. The stores closed in June 2017 after 65 years in business.
Ann Taylor parent company Ascena Retail Group  filed for Chapter 11 bankruptcy protection in July 2020, stating that it planned to permanently close a "significant" number of Justice stores, along with certain Ann Taylor, Loft, Lane Bryant, and Lou & Grey stores, in addition to permanently closing all of its stores in Canada, Puerto Rico, and Mexico, and closing all 326 stores under the Catherines brand. In November 2020, it was announced that the remaining Justice locations would be shuttered by early 2021.
 Arden B closed all stores by 2015 as part of a turnaround plan by parent company Wet Seal.
 Art Van Furniture, which had 300+ stores across the Midwest, announced on March 5, 2020, that it would close all stores. The company was founded by Archie "Art" Van Elslander, who opened the first store in 1959 in southwest Michigan.
 AT&T closed more than 250 locations permanently and laid off 3,400 of its staff in 2020.
 A&P, once America's largest retailer with 15,709 stores at its peak, closed its remaining supermarkets in November 2015 after 156 years in business. This included its namesake chain, along with Food Basics, The Food Emporium, Pathmark, Super Fresh and Waldbaum's, with over half of its stores sold to Acme Markets, Key Food (which included its Food Emporium chain and the Super Fresh trademark) and Stop & Shop. 
 Bath and Body Works announced the closure of 50 US stores and 1 Canadian store, along with the opening of 26 new stores, in May 2020 due to sales slumping amidst the COVID-19 pandemic.
 Barneys New York filed for bankruptcy on August 6, 2019. 15 of 22 stores closed, including Barneys flagship stores in Las Vegas, Chicago, and Seattle in addition to all but two of its outlet stores. In early 2020, it was announced that the remainder of Barneys' locations would be liquidated.
 BCBG Max Azria announced the closure of its stores in 2017, planning on going to department stores and online only. BCBG Max Azria Group filed for Chapter 11 bankruptcy protection on February 28, 2017, and was taken over by Marquee Brands and Global Brands Group.
 Bebe announced plans to close all stores and focus solely on online sales. At its peak, Bebe operated a total of 312 stores, but by March 2017, this was down to 172.
 Bed Bath and Beyond announced in April 2019 that it will close 40 stores and also open 15 new stores that year. The company continued to struggle through the retail apocalypse, and in late summer of 2022, Bed Bath and Beyond announced plans to close 150 stores, lay off 20% of its corporate and supply chain staff, and eliminate the role of COO and CSO within the company. Liquidity was raised to about $1B after a loan and additional financing were secured. Bed Bath and Beyond's stock was also down on the market by 28%. Analysts warned that the company was teetering on the edge of a Chapter 11 bankruptcy filing, citing that it may be too late to turn things around and that the company could default on its debt. Further exacerbating the financial woes, CFO Gustavo Arnal committed suicide only a few days after the store closures were announced. After months of continued losses and empty shelves, the chain warned that it was unable to pay off its debts and would potentially file for bankruptcy. In late January 2023, Bed Bath and Beyond announced the closure of an additional 87 stores, the liquidation of its Harmon Face Values chain, and the closure of 5 buybuyBaby stores. On February 8, 2023, Bed Bath and Beyond announced that it would close another 150 stores, selling its stock and raising $1B in an effort to stave off a bankruptcy filing. Days later, the chain's Canadian division was declared insolvent and began closing its 54 stores.
 Best Buy issued forecasts of a 2.2% compound annual growth rate through 2021; analysts noted that competition from Amazon.com likely played into the low growth expectations. Its shares dropped 10% in value (roughly $1.7 billion in market value) on the news. On March 1, 2018, Best Buy announced that it would close all 250 Best Buy Mobile stores in the United States by the end of May 2018. However, the Best Buy Mobile locations in Canada remained open.
 Blockbuster Inc. filed for bankruptcy in 2010; a vast majority of locations closed within years. As of March 1, 2019, only one video store worldwide, in Bend, Oregon, nicknamed The Last Blockbuster, remains out of over 9000 the chain once had.
 Bloomingdale's announced in 2012 that it would close four stores, including at the Mall of America in Bloomington, Minnesota.  Additionally, a home store at Oakbrook Center in Oak Brook, Illinois and full line stores in Perimeter Mall in Dunwoody, Georgia and at White Flint Mall in North Bethesda, Maryland have closed their doors. On January 3, 2013, Bloomingdale's announced that they would close the Las Vegas Home store at Fashion Show Mall.
 The Bon-Ton, a regional department store operator, filed for Chapter 11 bankruptcy on February 5, 2018. The company said it would close 42 stores. On April 17, 2018, the Bon-Ton announced plans to go out of business after being purchased by two liquidators.
 Borders Group, which included its namesake chain, along with Waldenbooks, filed for bankruptcy and closed all of its stores in 2011.
 Brooks Brothers filed for Chapter 11 bankruptcy in July 2020. It has been announced that a fifth of its stores will be closed along with all three of its American factories.
 Brookstone filed for bankruptcy on April 3, 2014. In early 2018, some news reports said that Brookstone has quietly been closing locations, including at SouthPark Mall, Eastview Mall, and Destiny USA among others. On August 2, 2018, Brookstone announced they would be shuttering all their mall-based locations to focus on their website and airport locations, days after the company was considering filing for bankruptcy.
 Bose shut down all of its 119 retail stores in 2020 in order to follow a "dramatic shift" to online shopping only.
 Carter's announced the closure of at least 200 stores in an earnings call in October 2020; the children's apparel chain planned to close about 80% of its locations by 2022.
 Century 21 shuttered its 13 locations across the east coast of the US in September 2020 as a result of bankruptcy proceedings. The company, however, would announce the return of its New York City flagship store in spring 2023.
 Charlotte Russe filed for Chapter 11 bankruptcy protection on February 4, 2019, and announced plans to close 94 stores. It had renegotiated its debts in 2018 and planned on liquidating if it could not be sold by February 17. It closed its online operation and began liquidating its brick-and-mortar inventory on March 7. Less than two weeks after all of its locations had been liquidated, the company announced a comeback and would reopen 100 locations in the United States.
 Charming Charlie filed for Chapter 11 bankruptcy protection on December 11, 2017, planning to close 97 of its stores. Charming Charlie emerged from bankruptcy in April 2018, but later announced in July 2019 that it would close all of its remaining locations. However, the company had a major resurgence 18 months after the second bankruptcy filing and has since reopened various locations.
 Chico's FAS closed 120 stores by 2017 and another 50 stores closed by 2018. The company announced a further 40 store closings in June 2022.
 The Children's Place announced on June 11, 2020, that 300 stores across the United States, Canada, and Puerto Rico would be closing in the following months.
 Christopher & Banks filed for bankruptcy on January 14, 2021, and announced it would be closing all of its 449 stores in 44 states.
 Claire's filed for bankruptcy on March 19, 2018, and closed 92 stores in the process. It emerged from bankruptcy in October.
 Coldwater Creek closed all stores in 2014 and became an online-only retailer operated by Sycamore Partners until a new store opened in Burlington, MA in early 2018.
 Crate & Barrel's children's line Land of Nod closed all of its retail stores in February 2018.
 CVS Pharmacy announced in November 2021 that it plans to close 900 stores over a three-year period, starting in spring 2022.
 David's Bridal declared Chapter 11 bankruptcy in November 2018 to reorganize and shed $400 million in debt.
 Dean & DeLuca announced closures of 31 of 36 U.S. locations on July 11, 2019, while suffering from major cash flow problems.
 Deb Shops went through its second bankruptcy in December 2014 and closed all its stores in March 2015. The company continued as online only plus size retailer from September 2015 until 2018.
 Destination Maternity, owner of maternity chains Motherhood Maternity and A Pea in the Pod, filed for Chapter 11 bankruptcy in fall 2019 and announced the closure of 180 stores with more closures to be expected. All Motherhood Maternity and A Pea in the Pod locations were closed by the end of 2019, although A Pea in the Pod would eventually re-launch brick-and-mortar operations with concept stores in Chicago and New York.
 The Walt Disney Company announced on March 3, 2021, that at least 60 of its physical Disney Store locations in North America would close and that the company would focus more on its e-commerce operations. 
 DressBarn announced the closing of the entire 650 store chain on May 21, 2019.

Retailers E–I
 Express announced that it would be closing all of its Canadian stores in May 2017, citing a challenging Canadian retail environment and poor exchange rates.
 Family Christian Stores went out of business entirely in May 2017 and closed 240 stores.
 Family Dollar announced the closure of up to 390 of its 8,326 locations on March 6, 2019.  Parent company Dollar Tree also said it would convert 200 others to Dollar Tree.
 Forever 21 filed for Chapter 11 bankruptcy in late September 2019 due to the company's large amount of debt. The company announced that it was going to close up to 178 of its 850 American stores and most of its stores in Europe and Asia. Speculation about the bankruptcy started to arise in late August 2019.
 Fossil announced some store closures and a restructuring campaign in 2016. Years later, the watch company was profoundly impacted by COVID-19 and announced the closure of at least 75 locations in March 2021.
 Francesca's filed for Chapter 11 bankruptcy protection on December 4, 2020, and 275 of its locations were closed. It was sold to TerraMar Capital LLC in January 2021 and exited from bankruptcy.
 Fred's, a variety store and pharmacy chain based in the southeastern United States, filed for Chapter 11 bankruptcy on September 9, 2019, and announced that all of its remaining stores would be liquidated. At the time of Fred's bankruptcy filing, 80 stores remained out of the 568 that the company had operated in February 2019; the company had reduced its store count in multiple rounds since April in an attempt to improve profitability. The decline of Fred's was attributed in part to the aborted merger between the Walgreens Boots Alliance and Rite Aid in June 2017.
 Fry's Electronics abruptly closed all 30 of its stores and its online operations on February 24, 2021. The chain had struggled with empty shelves and supplier issues during its final years of operation, fueling speculation that Fry's would close.
 Future Shop, an electronics chain in Canada, had all of its locations abruptly closed by owner Best Buy in March 2015, with 66 locations closing permanently and 65 locations reopening as Best Buy on April 4, 2015.
 GameStop announced plans on September 10, 2019, to close between 180 and 200 underperforming stores by the end of the fiscal year. GameStop has been affected by a shift in consumer purchasing habits of games, as makers have made it easier to purchase titles online for download, often through consoles, requiring no physical disc.
  Gander Mountain, an outdoor recreation retailer, announced in March 2017 that it was filing for bankruptcy and would likely close stores. In May 2017, the retailer announced that it was closing all 126 of its locations. However, CEO Marcus Lemonis then indicated that certain flagship stores, particularly in Michigan, might remain open depending on deals with store landlords and rental rates. It was later clarified that likely around 70 stores would remain open, even those currently running liquidation sales, possibly as Camping World, which acquired the company.
 Gap Inc. announced in September 2017 plans to close 200 stores in 2018, mostly Gap and Banana Republic stores while focusing their efforts on Old Navy and Athleta. On February 28, 2019, the company announced that they will split Gap Inc. into two separate companies, making Old Navy independent from Gap Inc. while at the same time announcing a closure of 230 Gap stores within the next two years.
 GNC closed over 900 stores in 2019, including between 300 and 400 of the chain's 800 shopping mall locations, which have been particularly hard-hit by declining foot traffic at malls overall.
 Godiva Chocolatier closed all of its North American retail locations in 2021 after the chocolate company faced a decrease in sales and foot traffic.
 Golfsmith filed for Chapter 11 bankruptcy and closed all stores in 2016. Assets were taken over by Dick's Sporting Goods and a select amount of locations became Golf Galaxy.
 Gordmans filed for bankruptcy on March 13, 2017, with half of its 100 stores and the Gordmans brand bought up by Stage Stores. Under Stage, Gordmans was converted to a discount store, which had a renaissance; Stage moved to convert some of its Peebles stores to Gordmans. However, in May 2020, it was announced that Stage had filed for bankruptcy and would be going out of business, liquidating its nearly 800 department stores with no buyer found for the chain.
 Guitar Center laid off 180 of its 7,000 employees in 2015; by 2018, the retailer was said to be on the verge of bankruptcy due to unsustainable debt loads and the decreasing popularity of musical instruments. The company eventually filed for bankruptcy in November 2020.
  Gymboree first announced in the summer of 2017 that it would close 375-450 stores and subsequently announced in January 2019 that it would be shutting down all Gymboree and Crazy 8 stores after its second bankruptcy filing in two years. Its more upscale Janie and Jack business was sold to Gap.
 Haggen, after expansion south of Washington state, filed for bankruptcy on September 8, 2015. On March 11, 2016, Albertsons reached an agreement to acquire the 29 "core" Haggen stores for $106 million, with 15 retaining the Haggen branding.
 Hancock Fabrics closed its remaining 185 stores in 2016 as a result of its Chapter 11 bankruptcy filing. A vast majority of its stores were sold to Michaels.
 Hastings Entertainment, which filed for bankruptcy in June 2016, closed all stores by the end of 2016.
 hhgregg, which filed for bankruptcy in March 2017, announced that it would close all 220 of its remaining locations in April 2017.
 HMV Canada announced that it would file for receivership on January 26, 2017, and close all of their stores by April 30, 2017.
 Henri Bendel announced in September 2018 that it would be shutting down by early 2019.
 Hudson's Bay Company announced in February 2019 that it will close all 37 Home Outfitters stores across Canada. In August 2019, the company announced that all Hudson's Bay locations in the Netherlands would be closed by the end of the year. The company had only entered the Dutch market two years previously.

Retailers J–R
 JCPenney announced in February 2017 that it would close 138 stores in 2017. Liquidation sales began on May 22 and stores closed by July 31. Another 8 stores and a distribution center closed in 2018 while over 50 additional stores were expected to close between mid-2019 and late 2020. JCPenney filed for bankruptcy on May 15, 2020, and announced plans to close at least 242 stores.
 J. Crew closed 61 stores in 2017 and sporadically closed additional individual stores in the first quarter of 2018. On May 4, 2020, J. Crew announced its filing for Chapter 11 bankruptcy.
 Kenneth Cole Productions shut down its 63 outlet stores in 2016 to focus its efforts on its e-commerce site.
 KIKO MILANO US branch filed for Chapter 11 bankruptcy on January 12, 2018, closing most of its stores in the United States.
 Kit and Ace closed all its stores in the US, UK, and Australia in April 2017, focusing on e-commerce and its 9 Canadian shops.
 Kohl's closed 18 stores in March 2016, although the company hasn't closed more stores as of August 2018 and only plans to shrink future Kohl's locations.
 La Senza was the dominant lingerie retailer in Canada at its peak, with 322 domestic locations and 497 franchised international locations in January 2009 for a total of 819 locations. Facing fierce competition, the retailer suffered a great decline and the loss of its Canadian dominance. As of September 2020, La Senza has a total of 277 locations worldwide: 74 Canadian stores, one United States location, and 202 franchised international stores.
 The Limited filed for bankruptcy in January 2017, went out of business, and closed its remaining 250 stores, but Sycamore Partners bought its IP.
 LifeWay Christian Resources, the publishing arm of the Southern Baptist Convention, announced that it would close all of its 170 LifeWay Christian Stores by the end of 2019 and shift its focus to its e-commerce business.
 L'Occitane filed for Chapter 11 bankruptcy in January 2021 and announced the closure of 23 unprofitable stores in its US branch.
 Lord & Taylor announced on June 5, 2018, that it would close 10 stores throughout 2019, representing 1 in 5 of its store count. This comes after parent company Hudson's Bay announced planned to shutter the Fifth Avenue store in New York City after they sold the property to WeWork. On May 5, 2020, Lord & Taylor announced that it would liquidate all of its locations.
 Lowe's announced in August 2018 that it would be closing all Orchard Supply Hardware locations. In November 2018, Lowe's announced that it intended to close 51 stores in North America as part of a plan to improve profitability.
 Lucky's Market closed all but 7 of its stores by February 12, 2020.
 Macy's announced plans in March 2017 to close at least 68 stores and eliminate more than 10,000 jobs. In January 2020, the chain announced that it would close 125 additional stores by the end of 2022.
 Marsh Supermarkets announced on May 11, 2017, that they were filing for Chapter 11 bankruptcy protection and that if they did not find a seller in 60 days, they would close their remaining 44 locations. Marsh eventually found buyers for 26 of its 44 stores. The remaining 18 were to be liquidated and closed and some of the other 26 would also be liquidated, as only the buildings were purchased, but not the stores' stocks of inventory. The remaining locations were purchased by Kroger and Fresh Encounter and have since been shuttered and rebranded.
 Mattress Firm filed for Chapter 11 bankruptcy on October 5, 2018. The company planned to close up to 700 of its over 3,200 company-owned stores, primarily in markets with multiple locations in close proximity to one another. Among the planned closures, at least 200 stores were slated for immediate closure. The company stated that it would not conduct liquidation sales for the affected locations, instead sending inventory to remaining stores, warehouses, or distribution centers. The company emerged from bankruptcy in November.
 MC Sports closed all stores in 2017 as a result of bankruptcy.
 Michael Kors announced in 2017 that it would close 100 to 125 of its standalone stores over the next two years.
 Microsoft announced on June 26, 2020, that the company would permanently close all but four of its 83 physical retail stores and focus on their e-commerce operations. All of the stores had been closed since March due to the COVID-19 pandemic. The four remaining locations, in New York City, London, Sydney, and Redmond, Washington, would be revamped as "Experience Centers".
 Modell's filed for Chapter 11 bankruptcy in March 2020 and announced plans to liquidate all of its stores.
Morphe Cosmetics abruptly shuttered all of its US locations on January 5, 2023, after facing years of financial losses, empty shelves, and controversies via its partnerships with YouTube influencers such as James Charles and Jeffree Star. Employees had flocked to social media days prior to call out the company's lack of transparency over layoffs and dwindling inventory, leading to speculation about the chain's future. A few days later, Morphe's parent company, Forma Brands, would end up filing for Chapter 11 bankruptcy.
 Multiply announced on May 31, 2013, that it would close their operations. It announced that it planned to continue its business as an archive photo and video site with their new mobile app.
 Myer announced the closing of three stores across Australia in September 2017.
 Neiman Marcus announced plans in September 2017 to close 25% of its Last Call outlet stores and would later shutter all but five of its Last Call stores in 2020. On April 19, 2020, Neiman Marcus announced that it would file for bankruptcy. The luxury chain filed for Chapter 11 bankruptcy in the Southern Court of Texas in May 2020.
 New York & Company shuttered all of its stores by late summer 2020 as a result of its parent company, RTW Retailwinds, filing for bankruptcy. In October 2020, its remaining assets were sold to New York investment company Saadia Group.
 Nike, Inc. announced plans to shift towards e-commerce and decrease its retail partners from 14,000 to 40.
Nine West filed for bankruptcy on April 6, 2018. They stopped selling shoes and closed their retail stores, shifting to online only.
 Nordstrom was unable to go private in 2017 due to the retail apocalypse. On May 4, 2020, Nordstrom announced that it would shutter sixteen locations.
 Olympia Sports announced the closure of all of its remaining stores in late July 2022. It had 35 stores at the time of the announcement, down from 225 at its peak.
 Party City closed 45 of its 870 stores in 2019, up from its usual 10 to 15 closures each year.
 Payless ShoeSource filed for bankruptcy in April 2017 and closed 400 of its stores. It emerged from bankruptcy in August, but announced on February 14, 2019, that it was filing for bankruptcy again and that it would close all of their stores and its online operation in the United States.
 Pier 1 Imports announced the closure of 450 out of its 942 locations in January 2020. It had initially only been expected to close approximately 70 stores. On February 17, the company filed for Chapter 11 bankruptcy and announced that it will be liquidating and closing all of its 67 Canadian stores; the company would later announce the closure of all of its 540 stores in May 2020 due to the COVID-19 pandemic.
 RadioShack filed for bankruptcy in March 2017 and planned to close 552 stores. This was the company's second bankruptcy filing in two years. A few months later, RadioShack announced the closure of 1,000 stores, leaving only 70 original locations open, not counting those doing business under the REV program.
 Ralph Lauren closed its five-story New York City flagship store on Fifth Avenue in April 2017.
 Revlon filed for Chapter 11 bankruptcy protection in mid-June 2022 following its attempt at preservation by obtaining a loan from Citigroup in 2018. Subsequently, the bank mistakenly wired $900M, rather than the intended $8M, for interest payments to Revlon's lenders; less than half of the wired sum had been recovered when Revlon filed for bankruptcy in mid 2022, stalling the company's reorganization plans.
 Rockport filed for bankruptcy in May 2018. The company that bought the company out of bankruptcy closed all 60 of its brick-and-mortar stores in July of that year.
 The Room Store filed for bankruptcy on December 12, 2011. Throughout 2012, all Room Store locations, except those in Arizona, which included Texas and the eastern and southern United States, were closed. The Phoenix-area stores (which were owned by The RoomStores of Phoenix, LLC), the last remains of the chain, were closed in 2016.
 rue21 announced plans to close around 400 stores in April 2017. The company filed for Chapter 11 bankruptcy on May 16, 2017, and emerged from bankruptcy in September.

Retailers S–Z
 Sally Beauty announced the closure of 350 locations in November 2022 with closings expected to be completed by the following month.
 Sam's Club, a subsidiary of Walmart, closed 63 stores in 2018. 12 of the 63 locations were expected to be converted into fulfillment centers.  Sam's Club locations in the United States decreased to 597.
 Sears Holdings, the parent company of Sears and Kmart, announced plans to close approximately 150 Sears and Kmart stores in 2017. The retailer, as part of required reporting, stated to the Securities and Exchange Commission that it had substantial doubt that any of its stores could continue to survive. Such a report is typically considered damaging to a company, as it affects their supply line. On April 20, 2017, Business Insider reported that the company was "quietly closing" more stores than it had initially announced and compiled a list of ten additional Sears and Kmart locations that were closing. On April 22, Sears also announced plans to close 50 of its auto centers and 92 pharmacies within Kmart locations. Further closures were then announced: on June 6, 2017, 72 Sears stores, on June 23, 18 Sears and 2 Kmart stores, with more to come per the CEO's blog post. The Canadian subsidiary, Sears Canada, successfully petitioned the courts on October 13, 2017, to allow it to close down the entire organization, including 130 stores, and liquidate all its assets by January 21, 2018, terminating around 12,000 positions. As such, all outlets were closed on January 14, 2018. In January 2018, the company announced 103 more stores by the end of April, of which 39 were Sears and 64 Kmart. The company filed for Chapter 11 bankruptcy on October 15, 2018. On February 8, 2019, Eddie Lampert announced that his $5.2 billion bid for Sears to survive succeeded, which would result in at least 400 stores remaining open. However, Sears subsequently announced the closure of 96 more stores in late 2019. Further dismantling of the Sears and Kmart store network continued in the subsequent years, and as of 2022, only three Kmart stores remain in the continental United States, with the company's headquarters also slated to be divested.
 Shopko filed for bankruptcy on January 16, 2019, and planned to close 250 of its more than 360 stores. However, on March 18, 2019, Shopko announced the closure of all remaining stores due to a buyer not being found for the chain. Liquidation sales ended by June 2019.
 Signet Jewelers, which owns prominent jeweler brands Kay, Zales and Jared, announced the closure of 400 stores in June 2020.
 Southeastern Grocers, owner of BI-LO, Harveys, Winn-Dixie, and Fresco y Más, filed for Chapter 11 bankruptcy on March 15, 2018. They are set to close down 94 out of 528 of their stores, many of which will have their related leases rejected and lease rejection claims rendered unimpaired. It emerged from bankruptcy in June 2018. The BI-LO brand would eventually cease operation in 2021 with all of its stores sold, rebranded, or outright closed.
 Sports Authority filed for Chapter 11 bankruptcy on March 2, 2016.  The company's stores were sold to a group of liquidators and its CEO  announced that all  stores would close by the end of August 2016.
 Stein Mart filed for Chapter 11 bankruptcy in August 2020 with intent to close all of its locations due to the COVID-19 pandemic.
 Sur La Table filed for Chapter 11 bankruptcy in July 2020. It was subsequently acquired by Marquee Brands and CSC Generation.
 Tailored Brands, the owners of men's fashion retailers Men's Wearhouse, Jos. A. Bank, and K&G, filed for bankruptcy in August 2020 and closed 500 of its stores. It emerged from bankruptcy in late 2020.
 Target Canada, the Canadian subsidiary of the Target Corporation, announced on January 15, 2015, that it would close all 133 stores in Canada by April 12, 2015.
 Teavana announced plans in 2017 to close all 379 of its stores by 2018, with parent company Starbucks citing lower mall traffic, and on August 29, 2017, Simon Property Group sued Starbucks over the Teavana closures.
 Things Remembered closed all of its remaining 176 stores and its headquarters in Richmond Heights, Ohio, in January 2023, moving to become an online-only gift retailer. The chain had previously filed for bankruptcy in 2019 and closed over 224 stores in the years following.
 Tops Friendly Markets filed for Chapter 11 bankruptcy on February 21, 2018, with over $1.18 billion in liabilities. The company announced on August 30, 2018, that they would close ten stores. The chain emerged from bankruptcy in November and announced its merger with Price Chopper Supermarkets in February 2021, a move made because it had fallen well behind its rival Wegmans.
 DSW, Inc. announced the closure of all of its Town Shoes stores in Canada on August 29, 2018. The stores shut down by early 2019.
 Toys "R" Us filed for Chapter 11 bankruptcy in September 2017 with over $5 billion in debt. It announced that its Canadian subsidiary would seek bankruptcy protection in parallel proceedings. On January 24, 2018, the retailer announced plans to close a total of 180 of its Toys "R" Us and subsidiary Babies "R" Us locations in the United States, approximately 20% of its U.S. store base, pending court approval. At least half of the closures will come from Babies "R" Us locations. In addition to closures, the retailer plans to quickly revamp a dozen locations to better co-brand the baby and toy experience with more revamps coming, cut the number of items offered in existing stores, revamp the loyalty program and pricing model to be more competitive, and promote the baby registry business to generate more sales of higher-priced items. In February 2018, Toys "R" Us announced that it will close 200 more stores. On March 8, 2018, Bloomberg News reported that Toys "R" Us was considering closing United States operations entirely. On March 14, 2018, the retailer announced it was shutting down all 100 of its locations in the United Kingdom, resulting in the loss of 3,000 positions. Later the same day, it was announced that all U.S. locations would be sold or closed, affecting as many as 33,000 jobs. Billionaire Isaac Larian of toy manufacturer MGA Entertainment, along with other investors, pledged $200 million to salvage up to 400 stores, but regardless, liquidation sales at all Toys "R" Us and Babies "R" Us began on March 23, 2018. All of the remaining stores closed permanently on June 29, 2018, but the Canadian stores remain open. However, in late 2018, the brand name was pulled out of bankruptcy protection; plans were made for it to return in the form of specialty stores under the name "Geoffrey's Toy Box." Tru Kids acquired the Toys "R" Us and Babies "R" Us brands in February 2019. Toys "R" Us reopened under this new management in 2019 with stores in New Jersey and Texas. Both locations closed in 2021, citing the COVID-19 pandemic and wanting to find new locations with better traffic.
  True Religion announced the closure of 27 stores on July 12, 2017, as a result of Chapter 11 bankruptcy. True Religion emerged from bankruptcy in October 2020.
 Tuesday Morning filed for Chapter 11 bankruptcy on May 27, 2020, and planned to close 230 underperforming stores out of 687. On February 14, 2023, Tuesday Morning filed for Chapter 11 bankruptcy again and announced the closure of 265 stores to focus on better-performing stores in other markets.
 Urban Outfitters, along with Anthropologie and Free People, closed 7 stores despite opening 19 stores for fiscal 2018, as "shoppers don't like their clothing" according to MarketWatch. 
 Under Armour has closed more than 50 stores due to slowing sales.
 Vanity, a mall clothing store based in Fargo, North Dakota, closed all of their stores by April 2017.
 Vera Bradley closed some stores in 2018.
 Victoria's Secret announced a closure of 333 stores: 30 in 2018, 53 in 2019, and 250 in 2020, up from the previous average of 15 per year. These combined closures amount to about 29% of the brand's stores. The parent company divested itself of La Senza in January 2019, which was further affected by the retail apocalypse.
 Vitamin World, a retailer of vitamins and health supplements, filed for Chapter 11 bankruptcy on September 12, 2017. The company planned to close 51 stores out of 334 total; 45 stores have already been closed since 2016. It was sold to Feihe International, Inc. in 2018.
 The Walking Company filed for Chapter 11 bankruptcy on March 8, 2018, with over $40 million in outstanding loans and $11.7 million in bond obligations. It emerged from bankruptcy in July.
 Wet Seal filed for its second bankruptcy in January 2017 and announced plans to close all its stores, which numbered 171 at the time.
 Z Gallerie announced in 2019 that they would be closing stores across the U.S. Its assets were acquired by DirectBuy at a bankruptcy auction in 2019.
 Zellers, once a widespread and popular Canadian department store chain, sold its retail leases to Target Canada, which, by 2013, shuttered its Canadian stores. The last two remaining Zellers stores closed on January 26, 2020.

References 

Lists of retailers
United States economic history-related lists
History of retail in the United States